Sybrand van Haersma Buma (born 30 July 1965) is a Dutch politician serving as Mayor of Leeuwarden since 2019. Until 2019, he was a member of the House of Representatives from 2002 who also served as the parliamentary leader of the Christian Democratic Appeal (CDA) from 2010 and as the leader of his party from 2012.

Biography

Early life
Sybrand van Haersma Buma descends from an old patrician family from Friesland. He is the son of Bernard van Haersma Buma (1932-2020) who was Mayor of Workum (1962–1970) and of Sneek (1970–1993). His grandfather was Mayor of Stavoren. Both his father and grandfather belonged to the Christian Historical Union (CHU), that merged in 1980 with the Catholic People's Party (KVP) and the Anti-Revolutionary Party (ARP) to form the Christian Democratic Appeal (CDA).

Van Haersma Buma studied law at the University of Groningen (1983–1989) and followed a course at the Sidney Sussex College, Cambridge (1989–1990). After his study he was employed at the Council of State and the Ministry of the Interior.

Politics
Van Haersma Buma was the secretary of the Christian Democratic Appeal in The Hague and a member of the executive committee of the Christian Democratic Appeal in the province of South Holland in the late 1990s. From January to June 2002 he was a member of the municipal council of Voorburg and since May 2002 he is a member of the Dutch House of Representatives. He became the party's spokesman on judicial affairs and is known for his law and order approach. From 2007 to 2010 he was the secretary of the Christian Democratic Appeal parliamentary group in the House of Representatives.

Although the Christian Democratic Appeal lost the elections of June 2010, Van Haersma Buma was re-elected. He supported his party chief, Maxime Verhagen, during the negotiations between the Christian Democratic Appeal and the conservative liberal People's Party for Freedom and Democracy (VVD) of Mark Rutte and the populist Party for Freedom (PVV) of Geert Wilders which eventually resulted in a minority government of the VVD and Christian Democratic Appeal with parliamentary support of the PVV. After parliamentary leader Verhagen became Deputy Prime Minister in the new First Rutte cabinet Van Haersma Buma was elected as his successor.

After the fall of the cabinet, Van Haersma Buma criticised the PVV, the party responsible for the break-up of the cabinet. Shortly afterwards he announced his candidacy for the party's leadership. On 18 May 2012 he was elected as lijsttrekker (top candidate) of the Christian Democratic Appeal by a majority of the Christian Democratic Appeal members. In the meantime he and the leaders of the People's Party for Freedom and Democracy (VVD), the Christian Union (CU), the Democrats 66 and GroenLinks, the so-called Kunduz coalition (a budgetary agreement) for 2013.

After the 2017 Dutch general election, the CDA formed the Third Rutte cabinet alongside the VVD, D66 and CU. However Van Haersma Buma remained in the House of Representatives as parliamentary leader instead of entering the government.

Buma was nominated as Mayor of Leeuwarden by the city's municipal council on 16 May 2019. He was succeeded by Pieter Heerma as parliamentary leader in the House of Representatives on 21 May. On 26 August 2019 Buma was appointed Mayor of Leeuwarden.

References

External links

Official

  Mr. S. (Sybrand) van Haersma Buma Parlement & Politiek
  Sybrand van Haersma Buma Tweede Kamer der Staten-Generaal

|-

1965 births
Alumni of Sidney Sussex College, Cambridge
Christian Democratic Appeal politicians
Dutch civil servants
Dutch jurists
Dutch members of the Dutch Reformed Church
Leaders of the Christian Democratic Appeal
Living people
Members of the House of Representatives (Netherlands)
Municipal councillors in South Holland
People from Nijefurd
Protestant Church Christians from the Netherlands
University of Groningen alumni
21st-century Dutch politicians
Mayors of Leeuwarden